Oakwood High School is part of the Oakwood City School District, Montgomery County, Ohio. The school is located in Oakwood, Ohio, at 1200 Far Hills Ave., and serves more than 690 students.  The school mascot is the Lumberjacks, though female teams for the school are usually referred to as the "Lumberjills" or "Jills". Oakwood was named "A National School of Excellence" by the U.S. Department of Education in 1991. The classes of 2009, 2010, and 2012 scored the highest out of any other schools in the state on the Ohio Graduation Test (OGT).

For the 2008–2009 school year, the Ohio Department of Education rated Oakwood as "Excellent with Distinction" scoring 108.7 (of 120 possible points) on its performance index. Oakwood satisfied all 30 of the state educational indicators for the school year. Additionally, U.S. News in 2013 ranked Oakwood as the 241st best public high school in the nation.

Clubs and activities

Energy Team

The school's energy team began in 2010 and has been led by Heidi Steinbrink since its inception. The energy team usually consists of 10-15 members of science-interested students. In this club, you will learn about various energy-related scientific matters. Most of the events the energy team does consist of teaching stations to younger children. The energy team is part of a state and national competition. The Ohio Energy Project has led the competition since the energy team's conception. Each year teams across the state turn in a scrapbook with all the work. In the past five years, the Oakwood team has placed first in the state and moved to the national competition in Washington, D.C.

Synergy

Synergy is Oakwood High School's contemporary a cappella group, which was created in 2016 by the school's choir director, Jeremy Storost. As of May 2018, the group consists of 10 high schoolers from grades 9-12.

Tech Team

The school's Tech Team has been in existence since 2005 and joined the Technology Student Association in 2008, becoming the first chapter in the Dayton, Ohio area. They have since competed in the BotsIQ competition with a small, wedge-style robot named Mortal Kombot.

Speech and Debate

The school's speech and debate program has been a success and has existed for nearly a century. It has qualified team members for the National Forensics League National Championship Tournament over sixty times during the team's run. The team offers competition in seven oratory and interp events, and Public forum, Lincoln Douglas, and Congressional debate.

Academic Decathlon
The Oakwood Academic Decathlon team is part of Academic Decathlon of Ohio and has won the state championship for 12 consecutive years. The team is coached by Lori Morris and has also won the Division III National Championship from 2012-17, 2019, 2021, 2022, and won the Division II National Championship in 2018 The Oakwood Academic Decathlon set the highest score record for any DIII school in 2016. Two students from Oakwood High School set individual records for the state of Ohio, being the first students in the state to break the coveted 9,000 point threshold.

Athletics
Oakwood High School plays in the Southwestern Buckeye League.

Oakwood High School is known for its excellent golf program. The boys' team has won the SWBL for the last 27 years (since 1992).

Oakwood Girls' Cross Country has had recent success with individual runners, with racers such as Mary-Kate Vaughn winning the Division II State Cross Country meet in 2012 as well as the Grace Hartman winning state two years in a row in 2020 and 2021 and Bella Butler as the state runner-up in 2021. Also Division II State Track and Field 3200m run in 2013 and Grace Hartman winning the Division II State Track and Field 3200m run in 2020,2021 and 2022, and the Girls Team won the state championship in 2021 and 2022.

Varsity sports offered:

Ohio High School Athletic Association State Championships

 Boys Baseball – 1997
 Boys Golf – 1985, 2009, 2010, 2012, 2013
 Boys Track and field – 1929, 1930, 1931
 Girls Tennis – 2005
 Boys Swimming – 2013, 2014
Girls Track & Field - 2021, 2022

Notable alumni

 Barry MacKay, tennis champion, tournament director, and tennis broadcaster
Annie Wang, entrepreneur and co-founder of Her Campus named to Forbes 30 Under 30 in 2017
 James Reston, longtime journalist and syndicated columnist with The New York Times, two time Pulitzer Prize winner
 John Sauer, American football player, coach, and broadcaster
Charlie Ross, comedian and distinguished Mask and Wig member
 Douglas Shulman, Commissioner of Internal Revenue
 Michael Hoecht, NFL football player
 Brock Turner, convicted sex offender
 Charles Whalen, United States Congressman
 Doug Bair, Major League Baseball pitcher
Beth Stelling, Comedian and writer
Nicholas Conard, Archaeologist

References

High schools in Dayton, Ohio
Public high schools in Ohio
Public middle schools in Ohio